Kendrick J. Wade is an American football coach and former wide receiver, who is the current and 18th head football coach at Mississippi Valley State Delta Devils He played college football at Coahoma Community College and Mississippi Valley State from 2001 to 2005. He played professionally for 4 seasons from 2006 to 2009. In 2023, Wade returned to his alma mater, Mississippi Valley State University.

Head coaching record

References

External links
 Mississippi Valley State profile

Year of birth missing (living people)
Living people
American football wide receivers
Coahoma Tigers football players
Mississippi Valley State Delta Devils football players
Mississippi Valley State Delta Devils football coaches
Delta State Statesmen football coaches
Fort Valley State Wildcats football coaches
African-American coaches of American football
African-American players of American football
21st-century African-American sportspeople